Eucomis amaryllidifolia is a species of flowering plant in the family Asparagaceae, subfamily Scilloideae, native to the Cape Provinces. It is a short, summer-flowering bulbous plant, with a dense spike (raceme) of yellowish-green flowers topped by a "head" of leafy bracts. In Afrikaans it is called  ('rock lily').

Description
The margins of the leaves are wavy. The inflorescence is a densely packed raceme with 30–50 individual flowers. The ovary is greenish yellow. The seeds are glossy and black.

It flowers in summer and early autumn (January to March in its native South Africa).

Taxonomy
Eucomis amaryllidifolia was first described by John Gilbert Baker in 1878. He referred to the leaves as "Amaryllis-like" in contrast with the broader leaves of E. undulata (now a synonym of E. autumnalis), which it otherwise resembled. In 1972, William Frederick Reyneke considered the species to be merely a variety of E. autumnalis, but then, in 1980, elevated it to a subspecies, as E. autumnalis subsp. amaryllidifolia. However, later research showed that E. amaryllidifolia was one of the smaller diploid species of Eucomis, with 2n = 2x = 30, whereas E. autumnalis was one of the larger tetraploid species, with 2n = 4x = 60. Accordingly, E. amaryllidifolia is now accepted as a full species.

Distribution and habitat
Eucomis amaryllidifolia is native to the Cape Provinces of South Africa, and in particular the Eastern Cape, possibly extending into the Orange Free State. It grows on rocky slopes and ridges, in full sun.

Cultivation
Eucomis amaryllidifolia was not in general cultivation . In the Kirstenbosch National Botanical Garden, it is grown in pots in an open, slightly acid medium. The pots are placed in a sunny position and watered well in summer, but kept completely dry in winter. A high potash fertilizer is used. Propagation is by seed, bulb slicing, leaf cuttings and tissue culture. Mealybugs can be a significant pest.

References

Scilloideae
Flora of the Cape Provinces
Plants described in 1878
Taxa named by John Gilbert Baker